David Buskin (born December 13, 1943 in New York City) is a singer, songwriter, performer, author, playwright, jingle composer and girls' basketball coach. He is well known for composing numerous television and radio commercials produced in the 1980s and 1990s.  He won a Clio Award in 1983 for Just Watch Us Now, NBC's signature jingle.

Biography
Buskin grew up in New York City. He graduated from Brown University in 1965 in the middle of the folk music era.  After Brown, he attended Berklee College of Music in Boston, MA where he began to write his own brand of folk-rock songs.  His brother is the writer John Buskin.

Composer
After selling five songs to Mary Travers for her album, Morning Glory, Buskin toured with her for several years as her opening act and they became lifelong friends.  Some of the other artists who have recorded his songs include: Astrud Gilberto, Judy Collins, Peter, Paul & Mary, Johnny Mathis, Shirley Bassey, Tom Rush, Roberta Flack, Dixie Carter, and Tracy Nelson.

In addition to his folk-rock music, Buskin has written numerous advertising jingles.  Among others, Buskin wrote the jingle for NBC for which he won a Clio Award in 1983.  He co-wrote All Aboard America for Amtrak, and did work for Burger King, JC Penney, and the US Postal Service.

He also helped create the children's show Generation O that was seen on the WB Kid's Network. He is currently working on a play to be directed by Tony Award winner and fellow Brown graduate, James Naughton.

Together with Janet Fox and Susan Hamilton he wrote a song "Every time a good time" for McDonald's (published by TUTTAPANNA MUSIC).

Performer

Buskin signed his first recording contract with Epic Records in the early 1970s.  He recorded two albums in Nashville and later toured with the rock group Pierce Arrow, recording two albums for Columbia Records.  Here he met Robin Batteau, and the two decided to become a duo.  David played guitar and piano; Robin guitar, mandolin, and electric violin. The partnership lasted until 1990. The Washington Posthas described the duo as "an irresistible amalgam of melodic, sensual pop, folkie grit and killer wit." They appeared together, composing and performing throughout New England in various clubs, including The Bottom Line.

David performs with his partners, Rob Carlson and George Wurzbach in the group "Modern Man – filling the void between The Three Tenors and The Three Stooges." "With the release of their third CD, "Assisted Living," the somewhat musical group known as Modern Man continued its assault on the out-moded idea that only those persons not yet manifesting symptoms of Alzheimer's should perform in public."

From 2005 to 2014, Buskin rejoined his former partner, Robin Batteau and percussionist Marshal Rosenberg.  They created a new CD and toured as "Folk du Soleil."  In April, 2014, Robin announced his retirement from performing, but reunited with Buskin starting in 2019 . From 2014 to 2015, David performed with his partners in "Modern Man," with a final concert in October, 2015

Personal life

Buskin resides in Katonah, New York. He is married to Jan Petrow.  He has one daughter from a previous marriage, Sophie, who is also a performer.

Awards

Buskin received the Clio award in 1983.
 
Buskin is the recipient of the "Kate Wolf Award" from the World Folk Music Association in 1999.

In 2002 Modern Man was awarded Backstage's "Bistro Award" for Best Musical."

Discography
 David Buskin (Self-titled) 1972
 He Used to Treat Her by David Buskin 1973
 The Winter Comes/When I Need You Most Of All by David Buskin
 Two on One by David Buskin and Robin Batteau 1990
 Buskin and Batteau by David Buskin and Robin Batteau
 Heaven Is Free Tonight by Dave Buskin 1993
 A Folksinger Earns Every Dime by David Buskin
 On a Winter's Night with Judy Collins
 New Year Live at Symphony Hall by Tom Rush, Fritz Richmond, David Buskin, Robin Batteau and Trevor Veitch
 Wealthy Man: Live at The Bottom Line, NYC by David Buskin & Friends
 Big League Babe - The Christine Lavin Tribute Album Part 2 by Hugh Blumenfeld, David Buskin, Robin Batteau, Patty Larkin, Sally Fingerett 1998
 The Wide Album: Modern Man by David Buskin, Rob Carlson and George Wurzbach, 1999
 Modern imMaturity by David Buskin, Rob Carlson and George Wurzbach
 David Buskin Goes Out On A Limb by David Buskin 2005
 B&B3 by David Buskin and Robin Batteau 2006
 Assisted Living by David Buskin, Rob Carlson and George Wurzbach 2007
 Red Shoes and Golden Hearts by David Buskin and Robin Batteau 2009

References

External links
 Brown University
 Modern Man
  World Folk Music Association
 "David Buskin Is Having It His Way" By Jill Schensul  The Bergen Record,  09-12-1992.
 The Wide Album, Modern Man.
 Clio Awards
 Buskin and Batteau website

1943 births
Brown University alumni
American male composers
21st-century American composers
Jingle writers
Living people
Musicians from New York City
Jingle composers
21st-century American male musicians